Abelia is an employers' organisation in Norway, organised under the national Confederation of Norwegian Enterprise.

It was established in 2001, and has 680 member companies. The current managing director is Paul Chaffey. Chairman of the board is Terje Wold.

References

External links
Official site

Organizations established in 2001
2001 establishments in Norway
Employers' organisations in Norway